The 1991 San Francisco State Gators football team represented San Francisco State University as a member of the Northern California Athletic Conference (NCAC) during the 1991 NCAA Division II football season. Led by Harold Hamilton in his first and only season head coach, San Francisco State compiled an overall record of 3–7 with a mark of 2–3 in conference play, placing in a three-way tie for third place in the NCAC. For the season the team was outscored by its opponents 288 to 257. The Gators played home games at Cox Stadium in San Francisco.

Schedule

References

San Francisco State
San Francisco State Gators football seasons
San Francisco State Gators football